Heitoraí is a municipality in central Goiás state, Brazil.

Location
Heitoraí lies 142 km. from the regional center of Anápolis.  Highway connections are made by federal highway BR-153 from Goiânia to Itaberaí then north on GO-156 for 38 kilometers.

Neighboring municipalities are Guaraíta, Itapuranga, Itaguaru and Itaberaí

Demographics
Population density: 15.48 inhabitants/km2 (2007)
Population growth rate:  1.67% 1996/2007
Population in 2007: 3,556 (3,283 in 1980)
Urban population in 2007: 2,468 (1,088 in 1980)
Rural population in 2007: 1,088 (1,450 in 1980)

The economy

The main economic activities are cattle raising with 23,890 head (2005) and agriculture.  The main crops cultivated are rice, beans, sugarcane, manioc, corn, and banana.  In 2006 there were 376 farms with an area of 12,856 ha. of which 9,000 ha. were natural pasture.  Approximately 1,000 workers were in the agricultural sector.  
Number of industrial establishments: 5
Number of retail establishments: 29
Number of motor vehicles: 249 automobiles and 43 pickup trucks
Number of banking establishments: none

Health and education
The literacy rate was  85.8% in 2000 while the infant mortality rate was 21.53 in 1,000 live births.  There were 06 schools in 2006, with 1,129 students.  Health care was provided by 1 hospital with 19 beds (2007).

Heitoraí ranked 0.744 on the Municipal Human Development Index, giving it a state ranking of 93 (out of 242 municipalities)
and a national ranking of 2,055 (out of 5,507 municipalities). (2000) For the complete list see frigoletto.com.br

See also 
 List of municipalities in Goiás
Anápolis Microregion
Microregions of Goiás

References

Frigoletto

Municipalities in Goiás